Digitivalva seligeri is a moth of the family Acrolepiidae. It was described by Reinhard Gaedike in 1975. It is found in Greece (including the Peloponnese, the type location).

References

Moths described in 2011
Acrolepiidae
Moths of Europe